Jefferson Parish Kidder (June 4, 1815 – October 2, 1883) was an American lawyer and jurist. He served as the non-voting delegate from the Dakota Territory to the United States House of Representatives. Kidder was the only Democratic lieutenant governor of Vermont until John J. Daley in 1965.

Early life
Kidder was born in Braintree, Vermont on June 4, 1815.  He attended the Orange County Grammar School in Randolph, and graduated from Alden Partridge's American Literary, Scientific and Military Academy (Norwich University) in 1834.  He studied law in Montpelier, was admitted to the bar in 1839 and practiced in Braintree and West Randolph.  Among the prospective attorneys who studied law under Kidder's supervision were John W. Rowell, who went on to serve as chief justice of the Vermont Supreme Court and Carl C. Pope, a legislator and judge in Wisconsin.

Career
He was a member of the Vermont Constitutional Convention in 1843. He served as State's Attorney for Orange County (1842-1847), a member of the Vermont State Senate (1847-1849), the Lieutenant Governor of Vermont (1852-1853), and a delegate to the 1856 Democratic National Convention.

In 1848 he received the honorary degree of Master of Arts from the University of Vermont.

In 1857 Kidder moved to St. Paul, Minnesota, where he joined the Republican Party.

In 1859, Kidder moved to Dakota Territory and became a delegate to Congress from the provisional government at Sioux Falls.

In 1862 and 1863, he was elected to the Minnesota House of Representatives. In 1865 he moved to Vermillion, Dakota Territory, when Abraham Lincoln appointed him an associate justice of the territorial Supreme Court.

In 1874, he was elected as the territory's delegate to Congress. He served from March 4, 1875 to March 3, 1879 and was an unsuccessful candidate for renomination in 1878.

1879, Kidder was reappointed to the Supreme Court of Dakota Territory. He served until his death in 1883.

Death and burial
Kidder died in St. Paul on October 2, 1883.  He was buried in St. Paul's Oakland Cemetery.

Family
His son Lyman Kidder was a US Cavalry 2nd lieutenant serving in the 2nd Cavalry under George Armstrong Custer, and was killed in action in what would be dubbed the Kidder massacre.

Jefferson Kidder was also the grandfather of noted lawman and Arizona Ranger Jeff Kidder.

Legacy
Kidder County, North Dakota is named for him.

References

External links

1815 births
1883 deaths
People from Braintree, Vermont
Norwich University alumni
Vermont lawyers
Vermont Democrats
State's attorneys in Vermont
Vermont state senators
Lieutenant Governors of Vermont
Minnesota Republicans
Minnesota lawyers
Members of the Minnesota House of Representatives
South Dakota Republicans
South Dakota lawyers
Justices of the Dakota Territorial Supreme Court
19th-century American judges
Delegates to the United States House of Representatives from Dakota Territory
Burials in Minnesota
19th-century American politicians
People from Vermillion, South Dakota
19th-century American lawyers